USS Meyer may refer to more than one United States Navy ship:

 , a destroyer in commission from 1919 to 1929
 , a guided-missile destroyer in commission since 2009

See also
 

United States Navy ship names